Gaudenzio is an Italian masculine given name. It arose from the Latin Gaudentius which means happy.

Notable persons with that name include:

People with the given name Gaudenzio
Gaudenzio Bernasconi, Italian footballer
Gaudenzio Botti, Italian painter
Gaudenzio Ferrari, Italian painter
Gaudenzio Godioz, Italian skier
Gaudenzio Marconi, Italian photographer
Gaudenzio Meneghesso, Italian engineer
Gaudenzio Poli. Italian Catholic prelate
Carlo Gaudenzio Madruzzo, Italian Catholic cardinal

See also

References 

Italian masculine given names